The Sound of Symmetry is the only EP and final release by metalcore band Sky Eats Airplane. It is also the only release by the group with a new lineup since their completed set of members, which consists of Bryan Zimmerman on lead vocals, Elliot Coleman on bass guitar and vocals, and Travis Orbin on drums. The band's line-up also consists of Zack Ordway (lead guitarist, who was featured on the band's second and self-titled album) and Lee Duck, the band's only remaining founding member.

Currently two songs from the EP have been uploaded to the band's MySpace and are available to listen to: "Sound of Symmetry" and "The Contour". The whole EP can be bought from the iTunes Store.

Track list

Personnel
Sky Eats Airplane
 Bryan Zimmerman - lead vocals
 Zack Ordway - lead guitar
 Lee Duck – rhythm guitar, keyboards, synthesizers, electronics, programming, backing vocals
 Elliot Coleman - bass, backing vocals
 Travis "The Orbinator" Orbin - drums, percussion

Additional
 Taylor Larson – production, mixing
 Paul Leavitt – mixing
 Will Quinnell – mastering
 Kyle Crawford – art direction, design

References

2010 EPs
Sky Eats Airplane albums
Equal Vision Records albums
Post-hardcore EPs
Metalcore EPs